Kamel Chergui (born 16 April 1993) is a French professional footballer who plays as a right winger for Championnat National 2 club Créteil.

Career
Chergui made his professional debut for Châteauroux in a 3–2 Ligue 2 win over Brest on 28 July 2017.

In January 2019, Chergui signed for Le Puy. He moved to Créteil in July 2020.

Personal life
Chergui is of Algerian descent.

References

External links

1993 births
Living people
Footballers from Saint-Étienne
Association football midfielders
French footballers
French sportspeople of Algerian descent
Grenoble Foot 38 players
LB Châteauroux players
Le Puy Foot 43 Auvergne players
US Créteil-Lusitanos players
Ligue 2 players
Championnat National 3 players
Championnat National 2 players
Championnat National players